Gasparotti is an Italian surname. Notable people with the surname include:

Jean-Pierre Gasparotti (born 1942), Monegasque sport shooter
Tommaso Gasparotti (1785–1847), Italian poet, painter, paleographist, and bibliophile archivist

See also
Gasparotto

Italian-language surnames